Ahmadabad-e Barkeh (also Romanized as Aḩmadābād-e Barkeh; also known as Aḩmadābād) is a village in Dasht-e Lali Rural District, in the Central District of Lali County, Khuzestan Province, Iran. At the 2006 census, its population was 69, in 12 families.

References 

Populated places in Lali County